Boucek is a surname. Notable people with the surname include:

Emil J. Boucek (1917–2005), American politician
Jaroslav Bouček (1912–1987), Czech footballer
Jenny Boucek (born 1973), American basketball player and coach
Zdeněk Bouček (1924–2011), Czech entomologist